The following lists the top 25 albums of 2016 in Australia from the Australian Recording Industry Association (ARIA) end-of-year albums chart.

Adele’s album 25 was the most popular album in 2016 in Australia, for the second year in a row. The album spent 45 weeks in the top 10.

For the 6th year in a row, Michael Bublé's Christmas made the end of year top ten. In December 2016, the album surpassed one million copies in Australia, making it the 12th biggest selling album of all-time in Australia.

Keith Urban's Ripcord was the highest selling album by an Australian artist in 2016.

Top 25

See also 
 List of number-one albums of 2016 (Australia)
 List of Top 25 singles for 2016 in Australia

References

Australian record charts
2016 in Australian music
Australia Top 25 Albums